Marilyn Lysohir (born 1950) is an American ceramist.

Lysohir is a native of Sharon, Pennsylvania whose mother served in the United States Marine Corps. Beginning in high school, she worked for a chocolate factory, eventually creating sculptures out of chocolate. In 1972 she earned her bachelor's degree from Ohio Northern University, following with a Master of Fine Arts degree from Washington State University in 1979. She lives in Moscow, Idaho, where she is founder and co-owner of the company Cowgirl Chocolates; she also spent time as an adjunct instructor at the University of Washington, and has been an artist-in-residence or visiting artist at the Kohler Foundation, the Kansas City Art Institute, and Kent State University. Much of her work takes as its subject elements of her own family history. Lysohir, who is married to Ross Coates, is of partial Ukrainian descent. She and her husband are the founding editors of annual arts journal High Ground.

References

1950 births
Living people
American women ceramists
American ceramists
20th-century American artists
20th-century American women artists
21st-century American artists
21st-century American women artists
Ohio Northern University alumni
Washington State University alumni
Washington State University faculty
People from Sharon, Pennsylvania
Artists from Pennsylvania
American people of Ukrainian descent
20th-century ceramists
21st-century ceramists
American women academics